Radashkovichy - is a town in the Maladzyechna District of Minsk Region, Belarus.

A watershed of the Vileyka-Minsk water system is located in the Radashkovichy Raion.

History
As part of the Russian Empire, Radashkovichy belonged to the Vileysky Uyezd of the Vilna Governorate.

Coat of arms
On February 23, 1792, the coat of arms was received.

The arms was mentioned in confirmation royal privilege of February 23, 1792. On the arms in a silver background it is represented the stoning of Saint Stephen. In privilege of 1792 the arms is represented in a round shield, there was a version in a baroque shield later. The arms was registered by authorities of Belarus on December 23, 1999.

Demographics

Language
Language according to the Imperial census of 1897.

References
 The First General Census of the Russian Empire of 1897. Breakdown of population by mother tongue and districts in 50 Governorates of the European Russia (1777 territorial units)

Populated places in Minsk Region
Maladzyechna District
Urban-type settlements in Belarus
Vileysky Uyezd
Wilno Voivodeship (1926–1939)